The Kel-Tec P-32 is a sub-compact semi-automatic pistol using the short-recoil principle of operation that is chambered in .32 ACP. It was designed by George Kellgren. It is manufactured by Kel-Tec CNC Industries Inc., of Cocoa, Florida and was designed for concealed carry by citizens and by law enforcement officers as a back-up gun.

Design

The P-32 operates on Browning's short-recoil principle with a locked breech.

Similar in concept to a revolver, the P-32 has no manual safety, relying instead on the long double-action trigger pull and an internal hammer block to provide safe operation.  The pistol meets SAAMI guidelines, and will not fire if dropped. The P-32 has passed extensive SAAMI drop-testing at the H. P. White labs, as well as drop tests to military specifications. The trigger must physically be pulled for the gun to fire.

The P-32 is made of the following materials:  SAE 4140 ordnance steel for the barrel and slide; 7075-T6 aluminum for the internal frame which houses the firing mechanism (machined from a solid block of aluminum); and Dupont ST-8018 ultra-high-impact polymer for the checkered grip, frame, and trigger.

See also
 Kel-Tec CNC Industries of Cocoa, FL
 Pocket pistol
 Single column magazine

References

External links
Kel-Tec CNC Industries P32 page
Kel-Tec P32 Safety, Instruction, and Parts Manual 
Kel-Tec Owners Group  (KTOG)

Semi-automatic pistols of the United States
.32 ACP semi-automatic pistols